Ramón Jesurún Franco (other spelling: Ramón Jesurún, born in Barranquilla, Colombia on 30 November 1952) is a Colombian football official.

He is the current 1st Vice President of the South American Football Confederation (CONMEBOL).
In addition to that, since November 2015, he has been the President of the Colombian Football Federation (FCF).

Prior to this, from 2006 to 2015, he served as President of the Colombian Dimayor, which runs Colombian professional football.

Since 2016, he has been a member of the FIFA Council.

References 

Living people
FIFA officials
Sportspeople from Barranquilla
1952 births
CONMEBOL
Football people in Colombia